Trispectes is an extinct genus of prehistoric nautiloids belonging to the Orthocerida, a variety of mostly straight-shelled cephalopods.

References

 Paleodb-Trispectes
 Sepkoski's cephalopod genera

Prehistoric nautiloid genera